The men's freestyle 74 kilograms is a competition featured at the 2019 World Wrestling Championships, and was held in Nur-Sultan, Kazakhstan on 20 and 21 September.

Results
Legend
F — Won by fall
R — Retired

Finals

Top half

Section 1

Section 2

Bottom half

Section 3

Section 4

Repechage

 Zelimkhan Khadjiev of France originally won the bronze medal, but was disqualified after he tested positive for doping. Daniyar Kaisanov was raised to third and took the bronze medal. Kamil Rybicki of Poland moved up to the 6th place and received the Olympic quota.

References

External links
Official website

Men's freestyle 74 kg